Slime mold or slime mould is an informal name given to several kinds of unrelated eukaryotic organisms with a life cycle that includes a free-living single-celled stage and the formation of spores. Spores are often produced in macroscopic multicellular or multinucleate fruiting bodies which may be formed through aggregation or fusion. Slime molds were formerly classified as fungi but are no longer considered part of that kingdom. Although not forming a single monophyletic clade, they are grouped within the paraphyletic group Protista.

More than 900 species of slime mold occur globally. Their common name refers to part of some of these organisms' life cycles where they can appear as gelatinous "slime". This is mostly seen with the Myxogastria, which are the only macroscopic slime molds. Most slime molds are smaller than a few centimetres, but some species may reach sizes up to several square metres and masses up to 20 kilograms.

They feed on microorganisms that live in any type of dead plant material. They contribute to the decomposition of dead vegetation, and feed on bacteria and fungi. For this reason, slime molds are usually found in soil, lawns, and on the forest floor, commonly on deciduous logs. In tropical areas they are also common on inflorescences and fruits, and in aerial situations (e.g., in the canopy of trees). In urban areas, they are found on mulch or in the leaf mold in rain gutters, and also grow in air conditioners, especially when the drain is blocked.

Taxonomy

Older classification
Slime molds, as a group, are polyphyletic. They were originally represented by the subkingdom Gymnomycota in the Fungi kingdom and included the defunct phyla Myxomycota, Acrasiomycota, and Labyrinthulomycota. Slime molds are now divided among several supergroups, none of which are included in the kingdom Fungi.

Slime molds can generally be divided into two main groups.
A plasmodial slime mold is enclosed within a single membrane without walls and is one large cell. This "supercell" (a syncytium) is essentially a bag of cytoplasm containing thousands of individual nuclei. See heterokaryosis.
By contrast, cellular slime molds spend most of their lives as individual unicellular protists, but when a chemical signal is secreted, they assemble into a cluster that acts as one organism.

Modern classification
In more strict terms, slime molds comprise the mycetozoan group of the amoebozoa. Mycetozoa include the following three groups:
Myxogastria or myxomycetes: syncytial, plasmodial, or acellular slime molds
Dictyosteliida or dictyostelids: cellular slime molds
Protosteloids: amoeboid slime molds that form fruiting bodies

Even at this level of classification there are conflicts to be resolved. Recent molecular evidence shows that, while the first two groups are likely to be monophyletic, the protosteloids are likely to be polyphyletic. For this reason, scientists are currently trying to understand the relationships among these three groups.

The most commonly encountered are the Myxogastria. A common slime mold that forms tiny brown tufts on rotting logs is Stemonitis. Another form, which lives in rotting logs and is often used in research, is Physarum polycephalum. In logs, it has the appearance of a slimy web-work of yellow threads, up to a few feet in size. Fuligo forms yellow crusts in mulch.

The Dictyosteliida – cellular slime molds – are distantly related to the plasmodial slime molds and have a very different lifestyle. Their amoebae do not form huge coenocytes, and remain individual. They live in similar habitats and feed on microorganisms. When food is depleted and they are ready to form sporangia, they do something radically different. They release signal molecules into their environment, by which they find each other and create swarms. These amoebae then join up into a tiny multicellular slug-like coordinated creature, which crawls to an open lit place and grows into a fruiting body. Some of the amoebae become spores to begin the next generation, but some of the amoebae sacrifice themselves to become a dead stalk, lifting the spores up into the air.

The protosteloids have characters intermediate between the previous two groups, but they are much smaller, the fruiting bodies only forming one to a few spores.

Non-amoebozoan slime molds include:
 Acrasids (order Acrasida): slime molds which belong to the Heterolobosea within the supergroup Excavata. They have a similar life style to Dictyostelids, but their amoebae behave differently, having eruptive pseudopodia. They used to belong to the defunct phylum of Acrasiomycota.
 Plasmodiophorids (order Plasmodiophorida): parasitic protists which belong to the supergroup Rhizaria. They can cause cabbage club root disease and powdery scab tuber disease. The Plasmodiophorids also form coenocytes, but are internal parasites of plants (e.g., club root disease of cabbages).
 Labyrinthulomycota: slime nets, which belong to the superphylum Heterokonta as the class Labyrinthulomycetes. They are marine and form labyrinthine networks of tubes in which amoeba without pseudopods can travel.
 Fonticula is a cellular slime mold that forms a fruiting body in a "volcano" shape. Fonticula is not closely related to either the Dictyosteliida or the Acrasidae. A 2009 paper finds it to be related to Nuclearia, which in turn is related to fungi.

Life cycle

Cellular slime molds 
Many slime molds, mainly the "cellular" slime molds, do not spend most of their time in this state. When food is abundant, these slime molds exist as single-celled organisms. When food is in short supply, many of these single-celled organisms will congregate and start moving as a single body. In this state they are sensitive to airborne chemicals and can detect food sources. They can readily change the shape and function of parts, and may form stalks that produce fruiting bodies, releasing countless spores, light enough to be carried on the wind or hitch a ride on passing animals.

Reproduction of Dictyostelium discoideum 
Dictyostelium discoideum is another species of slime mold that has many different mating types. When this organism has entered the stage of reproduction, it releases an attractant, called acrasin. Acrasin is made up of cyclic adenosine monophosphate, or cyclic AMP. Cyclic AMP is crucial in passing hormone signals between reproductive cells. When it comes time for the cells to fuse, Dictyostelium discoideum has mating types of its own that dictate which cells are compatible with each other. A scientific study demonstrated the compatibility of eleven mating types of Dictyostelium discoideum by monitoring the formation of macrocysts, concluding that cell contact between the compatible mating types needs to occur before macrocysts can form.

Plasmodial slime molds 
Plasmodial slime molds begin life as amoeba-like cells. These unicellular amoebae are commonly haploid and feed on bacteria. These amoebae can mate if they encounter the correct mating type and form zygotes that then grow into plasmodia. These contain many nuclei without cell membranes between them, and can grow to meters in size. The species Fuligo septica is often seen as a slimy yellow network in and on rotting logs. The amoebae and the plasmodia engulf microorganisms. The plasmodium grows into an interconnected network of protoplasmic strands.

Within each protoplasmic strand, the cytoplasmic contents rapidly stream. If one strand is carefully watched for about 50 seconds, the cytoplasm can be seen to slow, stop, and then reverse direction. The streaming protoplasm within a plasmodial strand can reach speeds of up to 1.35 mm per second, which is the fastest rate recorded for any microorganism. Migration of the plasmodium is accomplished when more protoplasm streams to advancing areas and protoplasm is withdrawn from rear areas. When the food supply wanes, the plasmodium will migrate to the surface of its substrate and transform into rigid fruiting bodies. The fruiting bodies or sporangia are what are commonly seen. They superficially look like fungi or molds but are not related to the true fungi. These sporangia will then release spores which hatch into amoebae to begin the life cycle again.

In Myxogastria, the plasmodial portion of the life cycle only occurs after syngamy, which is the fusion of cytoplasm and nuclei of myxoamoebae or swarm cells. The diploid zygote becomes a multinucleated plasmodium through multiple nuclear divisions without further cell division. Myxomycete plasmodia are multinucleate masses of protoplasm that move by cytoplasmic streaming. In order for the plasmodium to move, cytoplasm must be diverted towards the leading edge from the lagging end. This process results in the plasmodium advancing in fan-like fronts. As it moves, plasmodium also gains nutrients through the phagocytosis of bacteria and small pieces of organic matter.

The plasmodium also has the ability to subdivide and establish separate plasmodia. Conversely, separate plasmodia that are genetically similar and compatible can fuse together to create a larger plasmodium. If conditions become dry, then the plasmodium will form a sclerotium, essentially a dry and dormant state. If conditions become moist again, then the sclerotium absorbs water and an active plasmodium is restored. When the food supply wanes, the Myxomycete plasmodium will enter the next stage of its life cycle forming haploid spores, often in a well-defined sporangium or other spore-bearing structure.

Reproduction of Physarum polycephalum 
Slime molds are isogamous organisms, which means their reproductive cells are all the same size. There are over 900 species of slime molds that exist today. Physarum polycephalum is one species that has three reproductive genes – matA, matB, and matC. The first two types have thirteen separate variations. MatC, however, only has three variations. Each reproductively mature slime mold contains two copies of each of the three reproductive genes. When P. polycephalum is ready to make its reproductive cells, it grows a bulbous extension of its body to contain them. Each cell is created with a random combination of the genes that the slime mold contains within its genome. Therefore, it can create cells with up to eight different gene types. Once these cells are released, they are independent and tasked with finding another cell it is able to fuse with. Other P. polycephalum may contain different combinations of the matA, matB, and matC genes, allowing over 500 possible variations. It is advantageous for organisms with this type of reproductive cell to have many mating types because the likelihood of the cells finding a partner is greatly increased. At the same time, the risk of inbreeding is drastically reduced.

Behavior

Similarity to Neural Systems 
Slime molds share some similarities with neural systems in animals. The membranes of both slime molds and neural cells contains receptor sites, which alter electrical properties of the membrane when it is bound. Therefore, some studies on the early evolution of animal neural systems are inspired by slime molds.

When a slime mold mass or mound is physically separated, the cells find their way back to re-unite. Studies on Physarum polycephalum have even shown an ability to learn and predict periodic unfavorable conditions in laboratory experiments. John Tyler Bonner, a professor of ecology known for his studies of slime molds, argues that they are "no more than a bag of amoebae encased in a thin slime sheath, yet they manage to have various behaviors that are equal to those of animals who possess muscles and nerves with ganglia – that is, simple brains."

Traffic System Inspirations 
Atsushi Tero of Hokkaido University grew Physarum in a flat wet dish, placing the mold in a central position representing Tokyo and oat flakes surrounding it corresponding to the locations of other major cities in the Greater Tokyo Area. As Physarum avoids bright light, light was used to simulate mountains, water and other obstacles in the dish. The mold first densely filled the space with plasmodia, and then thinned the network to focus on efficiently connected branches. The network strikingly resembled Tokyo's rail system.

Slime mold P. polycephalum was also used by Andrew Adamatzky from the University of the West of England and his colleagues world-wide in experimental laboratory approximations of motorway networks of 14 geographical areas: Australia, Africa, Belgium, Brazil, Canada, China, Germany, Iberia, Italy, Malaysia, Mexico, the Netherlands, UK and US.

The filamentary structure of slime molds such as P. polycephalum forming a network to food sources is similar to the large scale galaxy filament structure of the universe. This observation has led astronomers to use simulations based on the behaviour of slime molds to inform their search for dark matter.

Chemical signals 
The chemicals that aggregate slime molds are called acrasins. The first acrasin to be discovered was cAMP in Dictyostelium discoideum. During the aggregation phase of their life cycle, Dictyostelium discoideum amoebae communicate with each other by traveling waves of cAMP. There is an amplification of cAMP when they aggregate. In 2019, research done by University of Tokyo found that while pre-stalk cells move toward cAMP, pre-spore cells ignored cAMP.

The acrasin for Polysphondylium violaceum has been purified in 1983. It is a dipeptide that has been named glorin. Its major components are the amino acids, glutamic acid and ornithine. An amino group (NH3) and a carboxyl group (COOH) of the glutamic acid are blocked respectively by a propionyl group and an ethyl ester. An amino group on the ornithine molecule is blocked by a lactam ring. Both cyclic AMP and glorin are small molecules.

See also 
Sorocarp
Swarming motility
Water mold

References

Further reading

External links 

 
 
Slime mold photo series by Barry Webb, 2023

Common names of organisms
Eukaryotes